The Legacy Robe is a tradition begun in 1950 in which an ensemble member with the most Broadway credits receives a robe on the opening night of a Broadway musical. The original title of the robe, Gypsy Robe, was changed in July 2018.

Ritual 
Before curtain on the opening night of a Broadway musical, actors, stage managers, crew, and everyone associated with the play gather onstage for the Legacy Robe ceremony. At the center of the stage will be a representative of Actors' Equity Association and a recent honoree (formerly "gypsy"). The guest honoree wears the robe that's decorated with mementos and drawings from past shows. The Equity representative tells the history of the ritual and announces the newest recipient from the company. The new recipient puts on the robe, and circles the stage counter-clockwise three times as everyone touches the robe for good luck. The Legacy Robe recipient then makes their way throughout the theater to continue bringing good luck.

Rules of the Ritual
According to Actors' Equity Association, the following are the rules of the Legacy Robe:
 The Legacy Robe goes only to Broadway musicals with a chorus.
 The Robe goes to a chorus member only, whoever has the largest number of Broadway Chorus credits.
 The Ceremony traditionally occurs half an hour before opening night.
 The new recipient must put on Robe and circle the stage counterclockwise three times, while cast members reach out and touch Robe for good luck. The new recipient then visits each dressing room while wearing the Robe.
 The new recipient supervises addition of appliques from their show to the Robe. Important rules for adding mementos: for wearability, durability and longevity, add-ons must be lightweight, sturdy and reasonably sized so each Robe can represent a full season.
 The opening night date and recipient's name is written on or near the memento, and cast members only sign that section of Robe.
 The recipient will attend the next Broadway musical opening and will present the Robe to that show's recipient.

Although not mentioned in the rules, there are other customs observed before the new recipient of the Robe is introduced.  A representative of Actors' Equity invites cast members making their Broadway debuts to center stage to be recognized. The production's Equity chorus counselors are then introduced, followed by members of the chorus who have previously received the Robe. The current wearer reads a scripted history of the Robe, then introduces the new production's recipient.

History 
The ritual dates to 1950, when Florence Baum, a chorus member in Gentlemen Prefer Blondes, entered the men's dressing room wearing a robe, pale pink with white feathers. The men took turns trying it on. Fellow chorus member Bill Bradley sent a dressing gown from one of his fellow performers to his friend performing in Call Me Madam.  A feathered rose from Ethel Merman's costume was attached to the robe, and it was then given to a chorus member in Guys and Dolls. The robe continued to be passed from one show to another, each time with a memento added on.

The ritual has become more formal, with rules about how it is presented, worn and displayed. When robes are full of artifacts, a new robe is started. Retired robes are kept at the New York Public Library for the Performing Arts, at the Smithsonian, and at Actors' Equity.

In 2005, Brynn Williams from the Broadway cast of In My Life became the youngest recipient of the Robe at age 12.

On April 18, 2018, Actors Equity announced that the name of robe would be changed at the end of the current theater season. A poll was opened to union members to vote on a new name. The new name chosen is the "Legacy Robe"; the first Legacy Robe presentation took place on July 26, 2018, during the musical Head Over Heels.

References

External links 
 Gypsy Robe at the Actors' Equity Web site—background on "gypsies" and the Gypsy Robe
 Broadway's Gypsy Robe at City Lore
 Bill Bradley obituary, New York Times
 The Gypsy Robe, CBS Sunday Morning
"Robes & Recipients" actorsequity.org

Actors' Equity Association
Broadway theatre
Musical theatre
Theatrical organizations in the United States
Arts and media trade groups
Robes and cloaks